Jarmila Gajdošová was the defending champion, but lost in the quarterfinals to Mona Barthel.

Barthel reached the final where she defeated Yanina Wickmayer 6–1, 6–2 to win her first WTA Tour title. Win this win, Barthel became the first qualifier to win a WTA tournament since Tamira Paszek won Quebec City in September 2010.

This tournament also marked the first WTA main draw appearance of future French Open champion and world No. 1 Ashleigh Barty, who was awarded a wild card and defeated in the first round by Bethanie Mattek-Sands.

Seeds

Draw

Finals

Top half

Bottom half

Qualifying

Seeds

Qualifiers

Lucky loser
  Kristina Barrois

Qualifying draw

First qualifier

Second qualifier

Third qualifier

Fourth qualifier

References
Main Draw
Qualifying Draw

Singles
Hobart International – Singles